Runnymede and Weybridge is a constituency represented in the House of Commons of the UK Parliament since 2019 by Ben Spencer, a Conservative.

The constituency was created in 1997 and was represented from then until 2019 by Philip Hammond, who was Foreign Secretary from 2014 to 2016 and Chancellor of the Exchequer from 2016 to 2019.

Boundaries

The constituency is in north Surrey and comprises the whole of the area of the Borough of Runnymede plus the town of Weybridge in the Borough of Elmbridge.

The constituency has the following electoral wards:
In the Borough of Runnymede: Addlestone North; Addlestone South; Chertsey Riverside; Chertsey St Ann's; Egham Hythe; Egham Town; Englefield Green East; Englefield Green West; Longcross, Lyne and Chertsey South; New Haw; Ottershaw; Thorpe; Virginia Water; Woodham and Rowtown
In the Borough of Elmbridge: Oatlands and Burwood Park; Weybridge Riverside; Weybridge St George's Hill

History
The constituency was created in 1997 from parts of the former constituencies of Chertsey and Walton and North West Surrey.

From its creation until 2019, it was represented by Philip Hammond, of the Conservative Party, who served as a Cabinet Minister throughout the Cameron–Clegg coalition before holding in succession two of the Great Offices of State: Foreign Secretary from 2014 to 2016, and Chancellor of the Exchequer from 2016 to 2019.

Runnymede and Weybridge is a Conservative safe seat based on both length of tenure and size of majorities – the narrowest margin of victory was in the 1997 general election, of 19.2% of the vote.

Constituency profile
The constituency is roughly bisected by the M25. To the east are a series of affluent towns including part of Staines, Chertsey, Addlestone and Weybridge. There is more open land to the west, bordering Windsor Great Park and Chobham Common.

The constituency has incomes well above the national average, and lower than average reliance upon social housing.  At the end of 2012 the unemployment rate in the constituency stood as 1.3% of the population claiming jobseekers allowance, compared to the regional average of 2.4%. The borough contributing to the bulk of the seat has a low 14.7% of its population without a car, 18.3% of the population without qualifications and a high 29.9% with level 4 qualifications or above.

In terms of tenure 69.2% of homes are owned outright or on a mortgage as at the 2011 census across Runnymede.

Members of Parliament

Elections

Elections in the 2010s

Elections in the 2000s

Result declared at 02:19

Result declared at 03:21

Elections in the 1990s

Result declared at 03:31

See also
List of parliamentary constituencies in Surrey

Notes

References

Sources 
Election result, 2015 (BBC)
Election result, 2010 (BBC)
Election result, 2005 (BBC)
Election results, 1997 – 2001 (BBC)
Election results, 1997 – 2001 (Election Demon)

Parliamentary constituencies in South East England
Constituencies of the Parliament of the United Kingdom established in 1997
Politics of Surrey